The Tatanagar–Asansol Express is an Express train belonging to Eastern Railway zone that runs between  and  in India. It is currently being operated with 13511/13512 train numbers on tri-weekly basis.

Service

The 13511/Tatanagar–Asansol Express has an average speed of 47 km/hr and covers 165 km in 3h 30m. The 13512/Asansol–Tatanagar Express has an average speed of 50 km/hr and covers 165 km in 3h 20m.

Route and halts 

The important halts of the train are:

 
 
 
 
 
 
 (    alternative)

Coach composition

The train has standard ICF rakes with max speed of 110 kmph. The train consists of 10 coaches :

 1 Second Sitting
 7 General
 2 Seating cum Luggage Rake

Traction

Both trains are hauled by an Asansol Loco Shed based WAG-5 or WAM-4 electric locomotive from Jamshedpur to Asansol and vice versa.

See also 

 Tatanagar Junction railway station
 Asansol Junction railway station
 Asansol–Gonda Express

Notes

References

External links 

 13511/Tatanagar–Asansol Express
 13512/Asansol–Tatanagar Express

Transport in Jamshedpur
Transport in Asansol
Express trains in India
Rail transport in West Bengal
Rail transport in Jharkhand